Tomsk is a city and the administrative center of Tomsk Oblast in Russia, located on the Tom River. Population: 

Founded in 1604, Tomsk is one of the oldest cities in Siberia. The city is a notable educational and scientific center with six state universities consisting of over 100,000 students, including Tomsk State University, the oldest university in Siberia.

History

Toian ceded the land for the fortress to the Tsar.

In 1804, the Imperial Russian government selected Tomsk as the seat of the new Tomsk Governorate, which would include the modern cities of Novosibirsk, Kemerovo, and Krasnoyarsk, as well as the territories now in Eastern Kazakhstan. The new status brought development and the city grew quickly.

The discovery of gold in 1830 brought further development to Tomsk in the 19th century; however, when in the 1890s the Trans-Siberian Railway bypassed the city in favor of the village of Novonikolayevsk (Novosibirsk), development began to move south to connect with the railway. In time, Novosibirsk would surpass Tomsk in importance.

In the mid-19th century one fifth of the city's residents were exiles. However, within a few years, the city reinvented itself as the educational center of Siberia with the establishment of Tomsk State University, founded in 1880, and Tomsk Polytechnic University, founded in 1896. By World War II, every twelfth resident of the city was a student, giving rise to the city's nickname, the Siberian Athens.

After the October Revolution of 1917, the city became a notable center of the White movement, led by Anatoly Pepelyayev and Maria Bochkareva, among others. After the victory of the Red Army in the 1920s, Soviet authorities incorporated Tomsk into the West Siberian Krai and later into Novosibirsk Oblast.

Like many Siberian cities, Tomsk became the new home for many factories relocated out of the war zone from 1941. The resulting growth of the city led the Soviet government to establish the new Tomsk Oblast, with Tomsk serving as the administrative center.

During the Cold War, Tomsk became one of many designated closed cities, which outsiders and, in particular, foreigners, could not visit. Tomsk-7 received municipal status in 1956 and was renamed Seversk in 1992.

Administrative and municipal status
Tomsk serves as the administrative center of the oblast and, within the framework of administrative divisions, it also serves as the administrative center of Tomsky District, even though it is not  a part of it. As an administrative division, it is, together with seven rural localities, incorporated separately as Tomsk City Under Oblast Jurisdiction—an administrative unit with the status equal to that of the districts. As a municipal division, Tomsk City Under Oblast Jurisdiction is incorporated as Tomsk Urban Okrug.

City divisions
Tomsk is divided into four city districts: Kirovsky, Leninsky, Oktyabrsky, and Sovetsky.

Climate
Tomsk has a humid continental climate (Köppen climate classification Dfb) barely escaping a subarctic classification. In 2006, Tomsk experienced what might have been its first recorded winds of hurricane force, which toppled trees and damaged houses.

Politics

Tomsk is governed by a mayor and a 33-member Duma. The current mayor, appointed in 2013, is Ivan Klyayn, a member of The United Russia party.

Of the 33 members, 16 are elected from the eight double mandate districts while 17 are chosen from party lists.

In the October 2005 local elections, United Russia was expected to cruise to a solid victory; however, the Pensioners Party put up a strong showing. The final count was (proportional representation):
19.42% — 5 seats — Pensioners Party
17.85% — 5 seats — United Russia
9.95% — 3 seats — Communist Party
8.57% — 2 seats — Union of Rightist Forces/Yabloko coalition
7.77% — 2 seats — Liberal Democratic Party of Russia
14.67% — Against all candidates

Double mandates
10 seats — No party affiliation
4 seats — United Russia
1 seat — Pensioners Party
1 seat — Liberal Democratic Party of Russia

Smart Vote
In 2020, supporters of Alexei Navalny won at least 16 seats in Tomsk's 37-seat city council while the pro-Putin United Russia party secured no more than 11 seats.

Economy

Energy generation
Tomsk has the oldest electrical grid in Siberia. There are three power stations in the city:
TEC-1 (launched on January 1, 1896)
GRES-2 (launched on May 28, 1945)
TEC-3 (launched on October 29, 1988)

Tomsk consumes more electric energy than it produces. The bulk of the city's electric and thermal energy is produced by the GRES-2 (281 MWt) and TEC-3 (140 MWt) powerplants, belonging to Tomskenergo Inc. Tomsk supplements its energy needs with electricity generated at Seversk.

Education

A large number of educational institutions in the city have contributed to making Tomsk a major center for Russia's IT industry. Tomsk was one of the first cities in Russia to gain access to the Internet, which became available in the early 1990s owing to grants received by universities and scientific cooperation. Tomsk has a number of prominent institutions of higher education, including:

Tomsk Polytechnic University, founded in 1896 and opened in 1900, the oldest technical university in Siberia.
Tomsk State University, the oldest university in Siberia (founded in 1878, opened in 1888).
Siberian State Medical University, founded in 1930.
Tomsk State Pedagogical University
Tomsk State University of Architecture and Construction
Tomsk State University of Control Systems and Radioelectronics
Tomsk Economics and Law University
Tomsk Institute of Business
Institute of Petroleum Geology and Geophysics, Siberian Branch of RAS
Institute of Petroleum Chemistry, Siberian Branch of RAS
Institute for Monitoring Climatic and Ecological Systems, Siberian Branch of RAS
Republican Scientific-Technical Center at ISPMS SB RAS
Institute of Atmospheric Optics, Siberian Branch of RAS
High Current Electronics Institute, Siberian Branch of RAS
Institute of Strength Physics and Materials Science SB RAS
Siberian Research Institute of Agriculture and Peat
Tomsk National Research Medical Center, Siberian Branch of RAS

Transportation

Roads 

northern branch of the M53 federal road;
road R 398 to Kolpashevo;
road R 400 to Mariinsk;
Northern latitude highway Perm—Surgut—Tomsk (under construction).

Railways
Tomsk is a small railway center that is situated on the Tayga—Bely Yar line (Tomsk branch) of the Trans-Siberian Railway.

Access from Tomsk to the Trans-Siberian railway is available via the town of Tayga. A regional rail line links Tomsk with Tayga.

The Tomsk Railway existed as an independent entity until 1961. At the present time, the Tomsk line belongs to the West-Siberian Railway, branch of Russian Railways Corp. Trains link Tomsk to Anapa, Asino, Barnaul, Bely Yar, Moscow, Novokuznetsk, Novosibirsk, Sochi, and Tayga.

Public transportation
The majority of inner-city and suburban transportation is provided  by marshrutkas (routed taxis)  and minibuses (mostly manufactured by PAZ, and serving about forty routes).

Additionally, the city has eleven proper bus routes, eight trolleybus lines (built in 1967), and five tram lines (constructed in 1949). Private taxis are also readily available.

Air transportation
The city is served by Bogashevo Airport, which offers both domestic and international flights. Located 20 kilometers from the city center, the airport was renovated in 2013. The airport is home to offices for S7 Airlines, Aeroflot, Ural Airlines, Turukhan Airlines, NordStar Airlines, RusLine, Red Wings Airlines, ALROSA, and UTair Aviation.

Water transportation 
There is a commercial and passenger port on the Tom River.

Culture

Tomsk has many local cultural institutions including several drama theaters, as well as a children's theater and a puppet theater. Major concert venues in the city include the Conservatory Concert hall and the Tomsk Palace of Sport. The city also boasts cultural centers dedicated to German, Polish and Tatar languages and culture.

One of the city's prominent theaters was destroyed in an act of terrorism in 1905. The Korolevsky Theater (built in 1884–85) was being used by a group of communist revolutionaries when the theater was attacked and set on fire by members of the Black Hundred, a hard-line nationalist organization. Those who escaped the flames were gunned down by Black Hundred members waiting outside the theater. Estimates put the number of casualties between 200 and 1000.

There are a number of museums in Tomsk devoted to various subjects, most notably art, local history and wood carving. There is also a Museum of Oppression, housed in a former KGB dungeon. Tomsk State University has a number of small museums with exhibits on archaeology, paleontology, zoology, as well as a herbarium and a botanical garden

As in many other cities in the former Soviet Union, the revolutionary government destroyed a number of old churches in the city including two that had existed since the 17th century. However, Tomsk managed to save some of its churches by transforming them into machine shops, warehouses, archives, and even residential buildings. Since the end of the communist era some of the churches have been renovated and returned to their congregations.

Tomsk is well known for its intricate "gingerbread" decoration of traditional wooden houses in the area. However, the number of old homes in this style is decreasing due to redevelopment or some of them catching fire, as the structures have little to no fire protection.

Trud (Labor) Stadium, in central Tomsk is the base for matches with the FC Tom Tomsk, the city's professional football club. The team's 2004 promotion to the Russian Premier League gave local fans a chance to see some of the nation's best teams play at the city's own stadium.

Tomsk has many local media outlets including the  television station, shut down by the authorities and turned into an internet TV medium, the radio stations Radio Siberia and Echo of Moscow in Tomsk along with several newspapers (Tomskaya Nedelya, Krasnoye Znamya and Vechernii Tomsk).

In April 2006 Tomsk received international media attention as the venue of a major summit on economic cooperation, held in the city between Russian President Vladimir Putin and German Chancellor Angela Merkel.

Notable people

Theodore Kuzmich of Tomsk (1776/1777 – 1864), Russian Orthodox saint
Mikhail Bakunin (1814–1876), anarchist
Maria Bochkareva (1889–1920), soldier
Nikolai Borschevsky (b. 1965), hockey player
Nikolay Burdenko (1876–1946), surgeon
Edison Denisov (1929–1996), musician
Nikolai Erdman (1900–1970), dramatist
Abram Petrovich Gannibal (c. 1696 – 1781), general
Leonid Govorov (1897–1955), Marshal of the Soviet Union
Murat Kamaletdinov (1928–2013), geologist
Nikolay Kamov (1902–1973), engineer
Sasha Kaun (b. 1985), basketball player
Sergey Kirov (1886–1934), statesman
Nikolai Klyuev (1884–1937), poet
Vladimir Korolenko (1853–1921), writer
Valerian Kuybyshev (1888–1935), revolutionary
Yegor Ligachyov (1920–2021), statesman
Mikhail Mil (1909–1970), helicopter designer
Theodor Molien (1861–1941), mathematician
Nikolai Nikitin (1907–1973), engineer
Vladimir Obruchev  (1863–1956), scientist
Anatoly Pepelyayev (1891–1938), general
Ivan Petlin (17th century), traveler
Grigory Potanin (1835–1920), geographer
Alexander Radishchev (1749–1802), writer, philosopher
Viatcheslav Repin (born 1960), Russian and French author of novels, short stories and essays
Nikolay Rukavishnikov (1932–2002), cosmonaut
Gustav Shpet (1879–1937), philosopher
Pyotr Sobolevsky 1904–1977), actor
Konstantin Staniukovich (1843–1903), writer
Kanysh Satbayev (1899–1964), geologist
Herzl Yankl Tsam (1835–1915), military officer
Mikhail Usov (1883–1939), geologist
Alexander Volkov (1891–1977), writer
Lyubov Yegorova (b. 1966), Olympic cross-country skier
Yakov Yurovsky (1878–1938), Bolshevik

International relations
Tomsk is the only non-capital member of the Asian Network of Major Cities 21.

Twin towns and sister cities
Tomsk is twinned with:
 Monroe, Michigan, United States
 Toledo, Ohio, United States
 Tbilisi, Georgia
 Novorossiysk, Russia
 Smolensk, Russia
 Ulsan, South Korea

See also

Akademgorodok in Tomsk
Church of the Intercession of the Virgin Mary, Tomsk

References

Notes

Sources

External links

 
Tomsk: Cultural treasure in the taiga
Pictures for the 400th anniversary of Tomsk 
The Pictures of Tomsk on Flickr.com
Tomsk live webcams 
Pictures of Tomsk  

 
1604 establishments in Russia
Populated places established in 1604
Tomsk Governorate